Centre d'Esports Sabadell Futbol Club "B", S.A.D. is a Spanish football team based in Sabadell, suburb of Barcelona in the autonomous community of Catalonia. Founded in 1969, it plays in Segona Catalana – Group 4 and is the reserve team of CE Sabadell FC, holding home games at Camp De Futbol Pepin Valls in the neighbouring city of Castellar del Vallès.

History
Founded in 1968, Sabadell B moved down to the last category in 1980. Nine years later, it returned to Primera Regional, only lasting nine seasons in the category. It eventually folded in 2003, and the first team subsequently established an agreement with CF Can Llong. In 2006, Can Llong merged into Sabadell's structure, and the B-team was refounded under the name of Centre d'Esports Sabadell Amateur-Can Llong.

The club switched back to the name of Sabadell B in 2007, and after achieving promotion to Segunda Catalana in 2010–11, the club promoted to Primera Catalana at the end of the 2012–13 campaign.

On 14 June 2014, Sabadell B was promoted to Tercera División for the first time, after a 1–0 win against CF Sales Viladecans.

Season to season

Refounded

3 seasons in Tercera División

Current squad

References

External links
Official website
Futbolme team profile 
Unofficial website 
Arlekinats, fansite 
Arefe Regional profile 

B 
Spanish reserve football teams
Football clubs in Catalonia
Association football clubs established in 2006
2006 establishments in Spain